The Snaefell Mountain Course, a motorsport racing circuit that was once part of Grand Prix motorcycle racing, has more than 60 named corners, bends, straightaways, and other features. Unlike the closed-circuit race tracks now used in all Grand Prix championship races, the course runs  almost entirely along public roads of the Isle of Man.

This list includes prominent corners and other landmarks along the course, with names that are used in media coverage and by racers, spectators, and administrators.

The number of turns in the course is debatable – writing in his 1974 book, TT racer and motorcycle journalist Ray Knight mentioned that the Guinness Book of Records quoted 264, echoed by a 2011 report. Some of the curves, S-bends, turns at crossroads, and other features in the course would not seem significant to car drivers in public traffic, but they are very significant for high-speed racers.  is the highest average speed that has been attained over one lap of the course, by Peter Hickman on 8 June 2018 when he won the Senior TT. At jumps where most race machines rise clear off the ground, drivers of cars at slow speeds might not even notice a bump. At each corner, racers must consider adjusting their entry speed, focus on their pre-planned line, lean according to the nature of the turn, and anticipate accelerating, decelerating, turning again, or otherwise handling their machines as needed while exiting the turn.

There are road-side marker boards, posted in advance of the major features, bearing these names to inform practice racers, and during races they may remind racers what is coming. The turns generally aren't labelled by numbers as on short racing circuits.

Spectators also focus on named corners and other landmarks beside the course; many of the best vantage points are at turns where racers can be better seen as they slow down. As a guidebook for visitors to the Isle of Man describes:

Naming practices

While there are named turns in other racing circuits, naming of corners and other turns elsewhere is usually less salient. For example, there is the notable "Dunlop Curve" of the 24 Hours of Le Mans' automobile race circuit and motorcycle race circuit. But the turns in many courses are primarily referred to by numbers, e.g. turns of the 1909-built Indianapolis Motor Speedway in the U.S. are referred to as Turn 1 through Turn 13. The Snaefell Mountain Course is one of the longer racing circuits and has more turns.

Like named corners on other circuits, many are named after champion racers, such as Joey's Corner at the 26th Milestone, posthumously named to commemorate the 26 racing victories of racer Joey Dunlop on this course prior to his death racing in Estonia, and Hailwood's Rise/Hailwood's Height, named after famous rider Mike Hailwood, killed in a road traffic accident in central England. However, in 2013 McGuinness's and Molyneux's were named in honour of living rider John McGuinness and sidecar driver Dave Molyneux, ranking second and third in the tally of TT race wins. In 2017, a bend was named after a non-competitor for the first time; Raymond Caley was a long-time shopkeeper with premises on the course at Sulby.

Some corners on the Mountain course are named for riders who suffered accidents at the corner or nearby: Doran's Bend after Bill Doran and Brandish Corner, after Walter Brandish. Others refer to the corner's physical shape: Verandah, The Nook. More take names of nearby artificial or natural landmarks: Creg-ny-Baa (a pub), Tower Bends, Bray Hill. Landmark-based names may continue to be used long after their namesake is gone: Keppel Gate, Signpost Corner.

The roads are open to two-way public traffic for most of the year, but are closed during practice times and races. The Sunday of main race week is traditionally known as "Mad Sunday". Due to road traffic accidents, a newly formed road-safety committee in 1964 proposed that the Snaefell mountain road should be one-way traffic in the race direction for part of Sunday. Nowadays, for the entire racing season of several weeks in May/June and August/September, the mountain portion of the course (from Ramsey to Douglas) is restricted to one-way in the race direction, and parking is prohibited in various areas.

These and other provisions allow inexperienced racers and visiting motorcyclists to learn the corners and informally practice on the course.

The following is a partial list of named corners and other landmarks along the course. Turns described as left- or right-handers assume that travel is in the race direction, which is clockwise around the circuit.


Named corners

See also
Registered Buildings of the Isle of Man

Notes

References

External links

IOMTT: Where To Watch
IOMTT discussion of landmarks
IOMTT Prohibited and Restricted areas, in 2014 and 2015 are:  Part 1, Part 2,
 Part 3
Ultimate TT Course Map, a Google map

Snaefell Mountain Course Corners